Cedar Grove is an unincorporated community in Carroll County, Tennessee, United States. The zipcode is: 38321.

Notes

Unincorporated communities in Carroll County, Tennessee
Unincorporated communities in Tennessee